Jasper Nimo Nartey (born 21 January 1995) is a Ghanaian professional footballer who last played as midfielder for Ghana Premier League side Medeama S.C. He previously played for FK Rudar Prijedor in Bosnia and Herzegovina.

Career

Rudar Prijedor 
Nartey moved to Bosnia and Herzegovina and signed for Bosnian team FK Rudar Prijedor. He played there from 2015 to 2016. He made his debut on 9 September 2015, coming on in the 80th minute for Filip Arežina in a goalless draw against FK Olimpik. He played 8 league matches during his only season with the club.

Cheetah FC 
After his leaving Rudar Prijedor, Nartey returned to Ghana and joined lower-tier side Cheetah FC before moving to Medeama in 2017.

Medeama SC 
Nartey joined Tarkwa-based side Medeama SC in 2017. He made his debut for the club in the 2019 GFA Normalization Committee Special Competition, playing the full 90 minutes in a 3–2 victory over Bechem United. During the 2019–20 Ghana Premier League season, he played in 2 league matches before the league was cancelled as a result of the COVID-19 pandemic. He was named on the club's squad list for the 2020–21 Ghana Premier League season, but he parted ways with the club in January 2021 without featuring in a match that season.

References

External links 

 

Living people
1995 births
FK Rudar Prijedor players
Association football midfielders
Ghana Premier League players
Premier League of Bosnia and Herzegovina players
Ghanaian expatriate sportspeople in Bosnia and Herzegovina
Expatriate footballers in Bosnia and Herzegovina
Ghanaian footballers
Cheetah F.C. players